The Kuwait PSA Cup 2013 is the men's edition of the 2013 Kuwait PSA Cup, which is a PSA World Series event Platinum (Prize money : 190 000 $). The event took place in Kuwait City in Kuwait from 8 to 14 March. Ramy Ashour won his third Kuwait PSA Cup trophy, beating James Willstrop in the final.

Prize money and ranking points
For 2013, the prize purse was $190,000. The prize money and points breakdown is as follows:

Seeds

Draw and results

Finals

Top half

Section 1

Section 2

Section 3

Section 4

Bottom half

Section 1

Section 2

Section 3

Section 4

See also
Kuwait PSA Cup
PSA World Tour 2013
PSA World Series 2013

References

External links
Kuwait PSA Cup 2013 website
Kuwait PSA Cup 2013 Squash Site website

Squash tournaments in Kuwait
Men's Kuwait PSA Cup
Men's Kuwait PSA Cup